{{DISPLAYTITLE:C18H12CrN3O6}}
The molecular formula C18H12CrN3O6 (molar mass: 418.300 g/mol) may refer to:

 Chromium(III) nicotinate
 Chromium(III) picolinate

Molecular formulas